President Aquino may refer to:
 Corazon Aquino (1933–2009), 11th president of the Philippines
 Benigno Aquino III (1960–2021), 15th president of the Philippines and son of the 11th president

See also
 Aquino (surname)